Frederick Alexander may refer to:

 F. Matthias Alexander (1869–1955), Australian actor, developer of Alexander Technique
 Piers Flint-Shipman (1962–1984), British actor, also known by the stage name Frederick Alexander
 Frederick Alexander (cricketer) (1924–1984), English cricketer
 Fred Alexander (1880–1969), American top-ranked tennis player
 Fred Alexander (historian) (1899–1996), Australian historian
 Fred Alexander (rugby union) (1870–1937), South African rugby union player
 Fred Alexander (Leavenworth) (c. 1879–1901), an African-American man lynched in the town of Leavenworth, Kansas
 Frederick D. Alexander (1910–1980), politician from North Carolina